Lev Grigorievich Fridman (born 14 August 1969 in Sverdlovsk) is a Russian auto racing driver. Career highlights include finishing third in the 2006 Russian Touring Car Championship. He competed in four rounds of the 2007 FIA World Touring Car Championship at Zandvoort and Valencia. Driving for the Russian Bears Motorsport Team in a BMW 320i, his best placed finish was a nineteenth in his first race in round three. In 2008, he drove in the Dutch Supercar Challenge with the Russian Bears Team.

References

Russian racing drivers
1969 births
Living people
World Touring Car Championship drivers
People from Sverdlovsk
24H Series drivers